Kenneth Lloyd Sailors (January 14, 1921 – January 30, 2016) was an American professional basketball player active in the 1940s and early 1950s. A  guard, he is notable for inventing the jump shot as an alternative to the two-handed, flat-footed set shot.

Sailors was born Jan. 14, 1921, in Bushnell, Nebraska and grew up on a farm south of Hillsdale, Wyoming, where he developed his effective jump shot while playing against his  older brother Barton (known as Bud). He eventually brought his skills to the University of Wyoming, and in 1943 he led the Cowboys to the NCAA Men's Basketball Championship. Sailors was named the NCAA basketball tournament Most Outstanding Player for his efforts. He was the unanimous selection as College Basketball Player of the Year in 1943. He would earn the honor again in 1946. Sailors was the only player in the history of Wyoming Cowboys basketball to be selected as an All-American three times, in 1942, 1943, and 1946.

From 1946 to 1951, Sailors played professionally in the BAA and NBA as a member of the Cleveland Rebels, Chicago Stags, Philadelphia Warriors, Providence Steamrollers, Denver Nuggets, Boston Celtics, and Baltimore Bullets.  He was second in the BAA in total assists in 1946–47, was named to the All-BAA 2nd team in 1948–49, and averaged a career high 17.3 points per game in the 1949–50 season.  He scored 3,480 points in his professional career. Sailors was inducted into the University of Wyoming Athletics Hall of Fame on October 29, 1993. In 2012, he was named to the National Collegiate Basketball Hall of Fame.

John Christgau, author of the book The Origins of the Jump Shot, said that Sailors’ jump shot technique was the one that  modern fans would recognize as the "jump shot."  "I would say that squared up toward the basket, body hanging straight, the cocked arm, the ball over the head, the knuckles at the hairline — that's today's classic jump shot.".

In 2014, the University of Wyoming announced its plans to erect a specially-commissioned sculpture of Sailors outside of the University's basketball stadium, the Arena-Auditorium.

Sailors died on January 30, 2016, sixteen days after his 95th birthday, of complications from a heart attack he had in December 2015.

BAA/NBA career statistics

Regular season

Playoffs

See also
 John Miller Cooper

References

Further reading

External links

Official website for Kenny Sailors
 "Birth of the Jump Shot - CBSSports.com"
 "Kenny Sailors, forgotten star credited with inventing basketball’s jump shot," by Matt Schudel, Washington Post, January 30, 2016
Jump shot

 Kenny Sailors Papers at the University of Wyoming - American Heritage Center
 Selection of videos and photographs of Sailors at the AHC Digital Archive
 Sports, Recreation, and Leisure at the AHC blog

1921 births
2016 deaths
All-American college men's basketball players
Amateur Athletic Union men's basketball players
American men's basketball players
Baltimore Bullets (1944–1954) players
Basketball players from Wyoming
Boston Celtics players
Chicago Stags players
Cleveland Rebels players
Denver Nuggets (1948–1950) players
National Collegiate Basketball Hall of Fame inductees
People from Kimball County, Nebraska
People from Laramie, Wyoming
Philadelphia Warriors players
Point guards
Providence Steamrollers players
Wyoming Cowboys basketball players
Laramie High School (Wyoming) alumni